This article refers to crime in the U.S. state of Mississippi.

Statistics
In 2016 there were 91,115 crimes reported in Mississippi, including 238 murders. In 2017-2018 the violent crime rate dropped 8%. The city listed in Mississippi as the safest is Madison. As of 2018 there were only 18 violent crimes. The most violent city in Mississippi is Jackson, Mississippi as of in 2020.

Capital punishment laws

Capital punishment is applied in this state.

One of the two death sentences of Willie Jerome Manning (for two unrelated double murders) attracted national attention in May 2013 when the FBI rescinded an evidence report days before Manning's scheduled execution.

References